Ingrid Eileen Scheffer  is an Australian paediatric neurologist and senior research fellow at the Florey Institute of Neuroscience and Mental Health. She has made several major advances in the field of epilepsy research. Scheffer is credited with finding the first gene implicated in epilepsy. She has also described and classified novel epileptic syndromes such as Epilepsy limited to Females with Mental Retardation.

Early life and education 
Ingrid Eileen Scheffer was born in Melbourne, Victoria on 21 December 1958. She finished her secondary schooling at Methodist Ladies' College in 1976. She attended Monash University, from where she graduated with a Bachelor of Medicine and a Bachelor of Surgery (MBBS) in 1983. She went on to complete her PhD in neurology at the University of Melbourne in 1998.

Career and research
Beyond further describing the aetiology of epilepsy, Ingrid has worked to characterise new epilepsy syndromes, from infancy to adulthood, which have permitted appropriate treatment and diagnosis, such as Dravet Syndrome and Epilepsy limited to Females with Mental Retardation. Her work also provides for more accurate genetic reproductive counselling.

Awards and honours 
 L'Oréal-UNESCO Awards for Women in Science (2012)
 Prime Minister's Prize for Science (2014)
 Elected Fellow of the Australian Academy of Health and Medical Sciences
 Elected a Fellow of the Royal Society (FRS) in 2018

References 

1958 births
Living people
Australian neuroscientists
Australian women neuroscientists
Australian paediatricians
Australian women medical doctors
Australian medical doctors
Australian neurologists
Pediatric neurologists
Women neurologists
Women pediatricians
Monash University alumni
University of Melbourne alumni
L'Oréal-UNESCO Awards for Women in Science laureates
21st-century British women scientists
Fellows of the Australian Academy of Science
Fellows of the Royal Society
Female Fellows of the Royal Society
Fellows of the Australian Academy of Health and Medical Sciences
Officers of the Order of Australia